CDX4 may refer to:
 CDX4 (gene), a human gene that encodes a homeobox protein
 Fancy Lake Water Aerodrome, an abandoned airport